John Compton was a St. Lucian politician.

John Compton may also refer to:

 John Compton (footballer) (born 1937), English footballer
 John Compton (organ builder) (1876–1957), pipe organ builder
 John Compton (actor) (1923–2015), American actor
 John Joseph Compton (1929–2014), American philosopher
 John Compton (MP) for Gloucester
 John Compton (comics), comic book artist/writer, see Hank Chapman

See also
Jack Compton (disambiguation)